Spain has different speed limits for every kind of road and vehicle. Until 1973, there were no speed limits on Spanish motorways, a generic limit of 130 km/h was instated then in order to save fuel during the 1973 energy crisis. It was lowered to 100 km/h to prevent accidents, but it was raised again in 1992, this time to 120 km/h. There have been proposals to raise the speed limit to 130 km/h, but have been rejected so far.

As of the 7 March 2011 and until 30 June 2011, the maximum speed limit in Spain was reduced from 120 km/h to 110 km/h, in order to save fuel due to the ongoing Arab Spring.

On 29 January 2019, the speed limit was reduced from 100 km/h to 90 km/h on single-lane rural roads.

Standard motorway speed limit

Motorways and autovías:
120 km/h for cars and motorbikes
100 km/h for buses and vans
90 km/h for trucks and vehicles with a trailer weighing 750 kg or less
80 km/h for vehicles with a trailer weighing more than 750 kg
Bicycles and mopeds are not allowed to access a motorway – exceptionally bicycles may ride on the shoulders of autovías, but mopeds are banned.

Standard interurban rural roads speed limit 
90 km/h for cars, buses and motorbikes
80 km/h for vans, trucks and vehicles with a trailer, or campers weighing more than 3,500 kg
45 km/h for bicycles and mopeds

Specific speed limits
On all non-urban roads and motorways, school buses and vehicles containing contaminant, explosive or flammable materials must decrease their speed limit by 10 km/h.

On motorways, a minimum speed of 60 km/h is mandatory for all kinds of vehicles. Minimum speeds in the rest of roads are one half of the generic speed limit for every vehicle. If a posted speed limit sign is below this value, the minimum speed is the posted limit minus 10 km/h.

No legal sanction is established for driving at a measured speed within 3 to 10 percent over the speed limit, depending on the specific error margin of the radar.

Built-up areas speed limit 

Built-up areas:
50 km/h on urban roads with two lanes per direction
30 km/h on urban roads with one lane per direction
20 km/h on urban roads shared with pedestrians

References

Spain
Transport in Spain